Penitent Magdalene or Penitent Magdalen refers to a post-biblical period in the life of Mary Magdalene, according to medieval legend, and a large number of artworks showing this subject, including:

 Penitent Magdalene (Donatello), 1453–1455 wooden statue by Donatello
 Penitent Magdalene (Caravaggio), c. 1597 painting by Caravaggio
 Penitent Magdalene (El Greco), c.1594-1595 painting by El Greco
 Penitent Magdalene (Artemisia Gentileschi), c. 1625 painting by Artemisia Gentileschi
 Penitent Magdalene (Ribera), 1618-1623 painting by Jusepe de Ribera
 Penitent Magdalene (Titian, 1533), c. 1533 painting by Titian
 Penitent Magdalene (Titian, 1565), c. 1565 painting by Titian
 The Repentant Magdalene (Cagnacci), c. 1660–1663 painting by Cagnacci